Diego García (born 5 June 1895, date of death unknown) was a Spanish épée and foil fencer. He competed at the 1924 and 1928 Summer Olympics.

References

External links
 

1895 births
Year of death missing
Spanish male épée fencers
Olympic fencers of Spain
Fencers at the 1924 Summer Olympics
Fencers at the 1928 Summer Olympics
Spanish male foil fencers